Computational Resources for Drug Discovery (CRDD) is one of the important silico modules of Open Source for Drug Discovery (OSDD). The CRDD web portal provides computer resources related to drug discovery on a single platform. It provides  computational resources for researchers in   computer-aided drug design, a discussion forum, and resources to  maintain Wikipedia related to drug discovery, predict   inhibitors, and predict the  ADME-Tox property of molecules
One of the major objectives of CRDD is to promote open source software in the field of chemoinformatics and pharmacoinformatics.

Features

Under CRDD, all the resources related to computer-aided drug design have been collected and compiled. These resources are organized and presented on CRDD so users can get resources from a single source. 
Target identification provides  the resources important for searching drug targets with information on genome annotation, proteome annotation, potential targets, and protein structure
Virtual screening compiles the resources important for virtual screening as QSAR techniques, docking QSAR, chemoinformatics, and siRNA/miRNA
Drug design provides the resources important for designing drug inhibitors/molecules  as lead optimization, pharmacoinformatics, ADMET, and clinical informatics

Community contribution 
Under this category platform has been developed where the community may contribute in the process of drug discovery. 
DrugPedia: A Wikipedia for Drug Discovery is a Wiki created for collecting and compiling information related to computer-aided drug design.  It is developed under the umbrella of Open Source Drug Discovery (OSDD) project and covers a wide range of subjects around drugs like Bioinformatics, Cheminformatics, clinical informatics etc.
Indipedia: A Wikipedia for India is a Wiki  for collecting and compiling drug information related to India. It is intended  is to provide comprehensive information about India created for Indians by Indians. It is developed under the umbrella of Open Source Drug Discovery (OSDD) project.
The CRDD Forum was launched to discuss the challenge in developing computational resources for drug discovery.

Indigenous development: software and web services 
Beside collecting and compiling resources, CRDD members   develop  new software and web services. All services developed are free for academic use.  The following are a few major tools developed at CRDD.

Development of databases
HMRBase: It is a manually curated database of Hormones and their Receptors. It is a compilation of sequence data after extensive manual literature search and from publicly available databases. Hombres can be searched on the basis of a variety of data types. Owing to the high impact of endocrine research in the biomedical sciences, the Hmrbase could become a leading data portal for researchers. The salient features of Hombres are hormone-receptor pair-related information, mapping of peptide stretches on the protein sequences of hormones and receptors, Pfam domain annotations, categorical browsing options, online data submission. This database integrated in drug media so public can contribute.
BIAdb:    A Database for Benzylisoquinoline Alkaloids. The Benzylisoquinoline Alkaloid Database is an attempt to gather the scattered information related to the BIA's. Many BIA's show therapeutic properties and can be considered as potent drug candidates. This database will also serve researchers working in the field of synthetic biology, as developing medicinally important alkaloids using synthetic process are one of important challenges. This database integrated in drugpedia so public can contribute.
Antigen DB: This database contain more than 500 antigens collected from literature and other immunological resources. These antigens come from 44 important pathogenic species. In Antigen DB, a database entry contains information regarding the sequence, structure, origin, etc. of an antigen with additional information such as B and T-cell epitopes, MHC binding, function, gene-expression and post translational modifications, where available. AntigenDB also provides links to major internal and external databases.
PolysacDB: The PolysacDB is dedicated to provide comprehensive information about antigenic polysaccharides of microbial origin (bacterial and fungal), antibodies against them, proposed epitopes, structural detail, proposed functions, assay system, cross-reactivity related information and much more. It is a manually curated database where most of data has been collected from PubMed and PubMed Central literature databases.
TumorHope: TumorHope is a manually curated comprehensive database of experimentally characterized tumor homing peptides. These peptides recogninze tumor tissues and tumor associated micro environment, including tumor metastasis.
ccPDB: The ccPDB database is designed to provide service to scientific community working in the field of function or structure annotation of proteins. This database of datasets is based on Protein Data Bank (PDB), where all datasets were derived from PDB.
OSDDchem: OSDDChem chemical database is an open repository of information on synthesised, semi-synthesized, natural and virtually designed molecules from the OSDD community.
CancerDR: CancerDR is a database of 148 anticancer drugs and their effectiveness against around 1000 cancer cell lines.  These are target based drugs, CancerDR maintain comprehensive information about these drugs their target gene/protein and cell lines.

Software developed 
MycoTB: In order to assist scientific community, we extended flexible system concept for building standalone software MycoTB for Windows Users. MycoTB is one of the computer program developed under OSDD/CRDD programme. This software allow user to build their own flexible system on their personal computers to manage and annotate whole proteome of MycoTB.

Resources created 
CRAG: Computational resources for assembling genomes (CRAG) has been to assist the users in assembling of genomes from short read sequencing (SRS). Following major objective; i) Collection and compilation of computation resources, ii) Brief description of genome assemblers, iii) Maintaining SRS and related data, iv) Service to community to assemble their genomes
CRIP: Computational resources for predicting protein–macromolecular interactions (CRIP) developed to provide resources related interaction. This site maintain large number of resources on interaction world of proteins that includes, protein–protein, protein–DNA, protein–ligand, protein–RNA.
BioTherapy: Bioinformatics for Therapeutic Peptides and Proteins (BioTherapi) developed for researchers working in the field of protein/peptide therapeutics. At present there is no single platform that provide this kind of information.  This site include all the relevant information about the use of Peptides/Proteins in drug and synthesis of new peptides. It also cover problems, in their formulation, synthesis and delivery process
HiveBio: HIV Bioinformatics (HIVbio) site contains various types of information on Human Immunodeficiency Virus (HIV) life cycle and Infection.
GDP bio: GDP bio (Genome based prediction of Diseases and Personal medicines using Bioinformatics) is the project focussed upon providing various resources related to genome analysis particularly for the prediction of disease susceptibility of a particular individual and personalized medicines development, aiming public health improvement.
AminoFAST: Functional Annotation Tools for Amino Acids (AminoFAST)  server is designed to serve the bioinformatics community. Aim is to develop as many as possible tools to understand function of amino acids in proteins based on protein structure in PDB. The broad knowledge of proteins function would help in the identification of noval drug targets.

Web services for chemoinformatics 
First time in the world CRDD team has developed open source platform which allows users to predict inhibitors against novel M. Tuberculosis drug targets and other important properties of drug molecules like ADMET. Following are list of few servers.
MetaPred: A webserver for the Prediction of Cytochrome P450 Isoform responsible for Metabolizing a Drug Molecule. MetaPred Server predict metabolizing CYP isoform of a drug molecule/substrate, based on SVM models developed using CDK descriptors. This server will be helpful for researcher working in the field of drug discovery. This study demonstrates that it is possible to develop free web servers in the field of chemoinformatics. This will encourage other researchers to develop web server for public use, which may lead to decrease the cost of discovering new drug molecules.
ToxiPred: A server for prediction of aqueous toxicity of small chemical molecules in T. pyriformis.
KetoDrug:A web server for binding affinity prediction of ketoxazole derivatives against Fatty Acid Amide Hydrolase (FAAH). It is a user friendly web server for the prediction of binding affinity of small chemical molecules against FAAH.
KiDoQ: KiDoQ, a web server has been developed to serve scientific community working in the field of designing inhibitors against Dihydrodipicolinate synthase (DHDPS), a potential drug target enzyme of a unique bacterial DAP/Lysine pathway.
GDoQ: GDoQ (Prediction of GLMU inhibitors using QSAR and AutoDock) is an open source platform developed for predicting inhibitors against Mycobacterium tuberculosis (M.Tb)  drug target N-acetylglucosamine-1-phosphate uridyltransferase (GLMU) protein. This is a potential drug target involved in bacterial cell wall synthesis. This server uses molecular docking and QSAR strategies to predict inhibitory activity value (IC50) of chemical compounds for GLMU protein.
ROCR: The ROCR is an R package for evaluating and visualizing classifier performance . It is a flexible tool for creating ROC graphs, sensitivity/specificity curves, area under curve and precision/recall curve. The parametrization can be visualized by coloring the curve according to cutoff.
WebCDK: A web interface for CDK library, it is a web interface for predicting descriptors of chemicals using CDK library.
Pharmacokinetics: The Pharmacokinetic data analysis determines the relationship between the dosing regimen and the body's exposure to the drug as measured by the nonlinear concentration time curve. It includes a function, AUC, to calculate area under the curve. It also includes functions for half-life estimation for a biexponential model,  and a two phase linear regression

Prediction and analysis of drug targets 
RNApred: Prediction of RNAbinding proteins from ints amino acid sequence.
ProPrint: Prediction of interaction between proteins from their amino acid sequence.
DomPrint: Domprint is a domain-domain interaction (DDI) prediction server.
MycoPrint: MycoPrint is a web interface for exploration of the interactome of Mycobacterium tuberculosis H37Rv (Mtb) predicted by "Domain Interaction Mapping" (DIM) method.
ATPint: A server for predicting ATP interacting residues in proteins.
FADpred: Identification of FAD interacting residues in proteins.
GTPbinder: Prediction of protein GTP interacting residues.
NADbinder: Prediction of NAD binding residues in proteins.
PreMier: Designing of Mutants of Antibacterial Peptides.
DMAP: DMAP: Designing of Mutants of Antibacterial Peptides
icaars:Prediction and classification of aminoacyl tRNA synthetases using PROSITE domains 
CBtope: Prediction of Conformational B-cell epitope in a sequence from its amino acid sequence.
DesiRM: Designing of Complementary and Mismatch siRNAs for Silencing a Gene .
GenomeABC: A server for Benchmarking of Genome Assemblers.

References

Further reading

Bioinformatics software